Kishim District is one of the 29 districts of Badakhshan province in eastern Afghanistan.The district capital is Mashhad. The district is located in the Keshem Valley, a primarily rural area on the western edge of the province, and is home to approximately 89,833 residents, making it the second most populous district of the province.

Climate
Kishim has a humid continental climate (Köppen: Dsb), with warm summers and cold winters. The temperature in July averages . January has the lowest average temperature of the year.

References

External links
Map at the Afghanistan Information Management Services

Districts of Badakhshan Province